Omar Farah Iltireh (born 1933 in Ali-Sabieh, Djibouti) is a politician of the French Territory of the Afars and the Issas (TAFI) became the Republic of Djibouti in 1977. He died in France on May 6, 2008.

Career
He began his career as a teacher before devoting himself to politics.

The referendum on independence in 1967, the Democratic Union Issa led by Omar Farah Iltireh called to vote "yes", that is to say, to maintain the territory under French sovereignty. In November 1968 Omar Farah was elected to the Assembly TFAI of the list headed by Ali Aref Bourhan and was appointed minister of public service in local government.

He was elected to the National Assembly French in March 1973, where he replaces Moussa Ali Abdoulkader . Obtaining 26,105 votes to 35,230 votes cast, he defeated Ibrahim Harbi Farah, brother of the militant nationalist Mahmoud Harbi , who collected 9125 votes. It represents the TFAI during the fifth parliamentary term from 1973 to 1978. He participated in the Paris negotiations in February 1977 on the independence of the territory. In spite of its realization on June 27, 1977, it ends its mandate only at the end of the legislature, in April 1978.

After independence, he was responsible for business at the Djibouti embassy in Addis Ababa and consul-general in Dire-Dawa.

Family life
His son, Ahmed Omar Farah, wife in 1975 Warmog Ahmed Abar, first wife of the second President of Djibouti Ismail Omar Guelleh. He became ambassador of Djibouti in France in 1989.

References

External links
 page on the French National Assembly website

1933 births
Living people
People from Ali Sabieh Region
Djiboutian politicians
Union of Democrats for the Republic politicians
Deputies of the 5th National Assembly of the French Fifth Republic